Laura O'Connell Rapira (born 1988) is a grassroots leader, speaker and community activist from Aotearoa New Zealand. They advocate for equality around ethnicity, gender and LGBTIAQ peoples, the environment and political power for youth.

Biography 
O'Connell Rapira was born in Taranaki and later moved to West Auckland where they attended Green Bay High School. They are Māori of the iwi Te Ātiawa, Ngāpuhi, Te Rarawa and Ngāti Whakaue. They were inspired to work on big festivals in the United Kingdom and went on to work on both the Glastonbury Festival and the Secret Garden Party.

As a young person they were part of an accelerator programme for social enterprise initiatives. From this O'Connell Rapira co-founded RockEnrol in 2014 to encourage young people to enroll to vote in New Zealand's general election.

O'Connell Rapira held positions at Greenpeace and Oxfam when they were living in the United Kingdom. In 2012 O'Connell Rapira raised awareness of the environment in their local area of West Auckland by proposing an environmental education centre and ecological retreat.

In 2014 they became the director of campaigns at social justice organisation ActionStation, where they focused on digital campaigning. An advert for a new director appeared in October 2020, and in November O'Connell Rapira let people know they accepted a new role at the Foundation for Young Australians where they are the Executive Director, Movement Building. 

O'Connell Rapira is a contributing writer to New Zealand news website The Spinoff.

Recognition 
In 2017 O'Connell Rapira was nominated for the Te Whetū Maiangi Award for Young Achievers.

Personal life 
O'Connell Rapira identifies as queer bi-sexual and is frank about this being a driver for them to seek social justice and equality in society. Their identity and stand about a range of areas has made them a target for online abuse.

References

External links 
 Talk by O'Connell Rapira at an event in 2014 called Festival for the Future https://vimeo.com/106451253

1988 births
Living people
New Zealand women activists
Women political writers
New Zealand environmentalists
New Zealand women environmentalists
New Zealand politics articles by quality
People from Taranaki
Te Āti Awa people
Ngāpuhi people
Te Rarawa people
Ngāti Whakaue people